The Roots of the Self: Unraveling the Mystery of Who We Are is a 1995 book about human development by Robert Ornstein (author of The Evolution Of Consciousness). It explores the trajectory of genetics, creativity, and higher consciousness from womb to grave.

References

1995 non-fiction books
Harper San Francisco books